Jemma "Jem" Sara Palmer (born 10 April 1986) is an English model and professional wrestler. She was signed to WWE under the ring names Jemma Palmer and Penelope Carwin in the FCW brand promotion. She is also best known by the name Inferno, which she used in the 2008 British television series Gladiators.

Professional modelling career 
Palmer grew up modelling under the encouragement of her mother, winning the Little Miss Midlands and Miss Littlesea competitions as a child. As an adult she entered a number of competitions, becoming a finalist in the 2006 Musclemania Britain which she later won, Miss Hawaiian Tropic, Ms USA Dream Bikini Body and Miss Maxim UK competitions. She also came third in the Maxim Little Black Book UK modelling competition.

She went on to model in many publications including Muscle and Fitness, NutsLoaded, WWE Magazine, and FHM.

Following Jemma Palmers success at gaining celebrity status within the fitness and entertainment industries, Jemma now also judges the types of contests that launched her career. She announced that she will be judging the 2017 bodypower model search

Gladiators 

While her mother encouraged Palmer into modelling, her father encouraged her into athletics. She enrolled in the cadets where she began to train in climbing, abseiling and amateur wrestling. She would later gain a purple belt in submission wrestling.

As a fan of Gladiators growing up, when rumours mounted of a revival show in 2008 she began sending promotional material to television companies. Her wrestling manager landed her an audition for the similarly timed American Gladiators revival, but she received a call up for Sky1's British version days later and passed their fitness test. She performed in both series of Gladiators under the name Inferno, sporting red hair and a fiery, flirtatious personality. Despite not appearing on the American version, BBC America aired Gladiators in the United States. As a cadet, she also later appeared on Sky1's Battle of The Forces which pitted the British Army, Royal Navy and RAF against each other.

Some of the most popular gladiators characters, including Gladiator Inferno, were imortalised as action figures for fans to purchase and are now collectables.

Professional wrestling career

Independent circuit promotions (2005–present) 
Along with her other exploits Palmer also was a fan of wrestling, particularly the original incarnation of D-Generation X. In 2005, she began to appear for the Frontier Wrestling Alliance (FWA) mainly as a valet for Doug Williams. This led to her having a try out match with World Wrestling Entertainment (WWE) alongside Katarina Waters who went on to become Katie Lea Burchill. Although she was not signed, she was later offered a scholarship to train at Ultimate Pro Wrestling. During her time on the circuit, Palmer filmed a reality television show based on pro wrestling as one of the three lead stars.

After much training, she was booked for her debut match against Jetta at Pro-Wrestling: EVE's first show on 8 May 2010 in Sudbury, Suffolk. Before her match with Jetta she suffered an injury in her hand but wrestled the match anyway, with a storyline written in that Jetta attacked her and goaded her into a match while she was explaining the injury to the crowd. The referee stopped the contest and awarded it to Jetta out of concern for Palmer's health.

Palmer joined the British wrestling company UKW, where on season 1 episode 22 she became the UKW Women's Champion. Here, she was introduced to the crowd as "Inferno Jemma Palmer" and was accompanied to the ring by her sister Faye. You can watch the show on My Channel on Sky TV and watch Palmer's matches on YouTube.

World Wrestling Entertainment / WWE 
On 29 June 2009 it was announced that Palmer had signed a contract with World Wrestling Entertainment. and on 1 March 2010 it was announced that Palmer was going to be A WWE Diva.

Business interests 
In October 2011, Palmer invested in a company called www.buffnakedbutlers.co.uk, which provides semi-naked butlers for events in Wales and England.
She also part owns cocktail and events company www.TipsyParties.co.uk

In November 2017 Jemma launched tech company www.InfinitusUnlimited.com  a business consultancy providing business automation and workflow streamlining.

Championships and achievements 

UKW (United Kingdom Wrestling)

 UKW Women's Championship (1 time)
 Pro EVW Women's Champion (1 time)
 AWE Women's Champion (1 time)

References

External links 
 
 

1986 births
Living people
People from Tamworth, Staffordshire
English female professional wrestlers
Gladiators (1992 British TV series)